Charles Dieges (October 26, 1865 – September 14, 1953) was an American tug of war athlete who competed in the tug of war tournament at the 1904 Summer Olympics.

References

1865 births
1953 deaths
Olympic tug of war competitors of the United States
Tug of war competitors at the 1904 Summer Olympics
Sportspeople from New York City